The 2005 PGA EuroPro Tour was the fourth season of the PGA EuroPro Tour, one of four third-tier tours recognised by the European Tour.

Schedule
The following table lists official events during the 2005 season.

Order of Merit
The Order of Merit was based on prize money won during the season, calculated in Pound sterling. The top five players on the tour (not otherwise exempt) earned status to play on the 2006 Challenge Tour.

Notes

References

PGA EuroPro Tour